The men's 500 m sprint competition in inline speed skating at the 2001 World Games took place on 24 August 2001 at the Akita Prefectural Skating Rink in Akita, Japan.

Competition format
A total of 21 athletes entered the competition. Best two athletes from each heat advances to the next round.

Results

Quarterfinals

Heat 1

Heat 3

Heat 2

Heat 4

Semifinals

Heat 1

Heat 2

Final

References

External links
 Results on IWGA website

Inline speed skating at the 2001 World Games